A plant factory is a closed growing system which enables a plantsman to achieve constant production of vegetables all year around. The facility utilizes artificial control of light, temperature, moisture, and carbon dioxide concentrations.

See also
 Greenhouses
 Hydroponics
 Vertical farming
 Thanet Earth - An example of such a farm

Notes

Manufacturing plants
Intensive farming